The Appendix was an online magazine of "narrative and experimental history." It was co-founded in the fall of 2012 by Benjamin Breen, Felipe Cruz, Christopher Heaney, and Brian Jones. A stated goal of the journal is that "scholarly and popular history need to come together." It ceased publication in 2015 after publishing eight quarterly issues.

The journal featured articles from historians, anthropologists, artists, journalists, and other writers. The journal has been praised by Lapham's Quarterly, The Public Domain Review, Dan Cohen (academic), the blog of the American Historical Association, and novelist Midori Snyder, who called it "a terrific highly interstitial journal, that combines in a unique fashion history and narrative."

Material from The Appendix has been featured on the websites of The Atlantic, Slate, Jezebel, and the Smithsonian Magazine.

References

External links

https://googletoday.in/2022/07/29/appendix-ko-door-karne-ke-liye-yoga/

2012 establishments in Texas
2015 disestablishments in Texas
Defunct literary magazines published in the United States
History magazines published in the United States
English-language magazines
Magazines established in 2012
Magazines disestablished in 2015
Magazines published in Austin, Texas
Online literary magazines published in the United States
Quarterly magazines published in the United States